Shahriar Shafiq (15 March 1945 – 7 December 1979) was an Iranian Imperial Navy Captain and a member of the House of Pahlavi. He was the son of Shahdokht (equivalent to English term Princess) Ashraf Pahlavi, twin sister of the Shah of Iran Mohammad Reza Pahlavi.

His military career lasted from 1963 until the Iranian Revolution in 1979. He stayed until March 1979 when he had to escape Iran after months of fighting the revolutionaries.

Shahriar Shafiq resided in Paris until 7 December 1979, when he was assassinated by agents of the Islamic Republic.

Early life and education
Shafiq was born in Cairo on 15 March 1945. He was the son of Ashraf Pahlavi and Ahmad Shafiq, and brother of Azadeh Shafiq.

Shafiq was educated at the Royal Navy College in Dartmouth, the United Kingdom.

Personal life 
In 1967, Shafiq married to the Christian daughter of Manouchehr Eghbal, Maryam Eghbal, who had been married at age 18 to Mahmoud Reza Pahlavi in October 1964, one of his uncles and a half-brother of the Shah. Shafiq and Eghbal had two sons: Nader Shafiq (born 15 March 1968) and Dara Shafiq (born 1970).

Career and activities
Shafiq was an Imperial Iranian Navy Captain. He and his cousin Prince Kamyar Pahlavi, son of Abdul Reza Pahlavi, were the only members of the Pahlavi Dynasty who chose military careers. Shafiq was the highest-ranking military officer in the Pahlavi family. He worked in the navy of Iran from 1963 to 1979. He served as the commander of the Persian Gulf fleet of Hovercraft before the 1979 revolution.

Additionally, Shafiq was the head of Judo and Karate federation of Iran during the reign of Mohammad Reza Shah.

Later years and assassination
After the revolution of February 1979, he was the only member of the Pahlavi dynasty who stayed in Iran and kept fighting against the revolutionaries, up to the point when he had to flee in a small boat from the Persian Gulf to Kuwait, under heavy fire. He fled Iran in March 1979.

After leaving Iran, Shafiq first went to the United States. Then he joined his family in Paris, France, on 14 November 1979, and began organizing a resistance movement against the Islamic Republic. He founded the group, Iran Azad (Free Iran), which was later led by his sister Azadeh with whom he was living in Paris. They both acted as the Pahlavi family’s principal spokesmen. In Iran, Islamic judge Ayatollah Sadeq Khalkhali tried and sentenced him and other members of the Pahlavi family in absentia to death in a secret trial in the spring of 1979.

Shafiq was assassinated in Paris on 7 December 1979, being shot twice in the head by agents of the Islamic Republic on the Rue Pergolese, outside his mother's home. He was aged 34. The attack was carried out by a masked gunman. Ayatollah Khalkhali claimed that the assassination was carried out by one of his death squads. The Muslim Liberation Group announced that it was responsible for the assassination.

Shahriar's body was not buried, but embalmed and moved to New York City where it was kept by his mother.

References

External links
In Memory of Prince Shahryar Shafigh

20th-century Iranian people
1945 births
1979 deaths
Assassinated activists
Assassinated military personnel
Assassinated royalty
Deaths by firearm in France
Exiles of the Iranian Revolution in France
Exiles of the Iranian Revolution in the United States
Iranian monarchists
Iranian people murdered abroad
Iranian people of Egyptian descent
Iranian royalty
Mazandarani people
Murdered royalty
Military personnel from Cairo
People murdered in Paris
People of the Iranian Revolution
People of Pahlavi Iran
People sentenced to death in absentia
Terrorism deaths in France
1979 murders in France
1970s murders in Paris